Bellechasse is a provincial electoral riding in the Chaudière-Appalaches region of Quebec, Canada which elects members to the National Assembly of Quebec.  It notably includes a section of the city of Lévis as well as Saint-Henri, Saint-Anselme, Lac-Etchemin, Sainte-Claire, Beaumont, Saint-Charles-de-Bellechasse, Saint-Raphaël and Saint-Gervais.

It was created for the 1867 election, and electoral districts of that name existed even earlier: see Bellechasse (Province of Canada) and Bellechasse (Lower Canada).

In the change from the 2001 to the 2011 electoral map, it gained part of the Desjardins borough of the city of Lévis, namely the portion south of Quebec Autoroute 20.

Members of the Legislative Assembly / National Assembly

Election results

^ Change is based on redistributed results. Coalition Avenir change is from Action démocratique.

* Result compared to UFP

References

External links
Information
 Elections Quebec

Election results
 Election results (National Assembly)
 Election results (QuébecPolitique)

Maps
 2011 map (PDF)
 2001 map (Flash)
2001–2011 changes (Flash)
1992–2001 changes (Flash)
 Electoral map of Chaudière-Appalaches region
 Quebec electoral map, 2011

Quebec provincial electoral districts